Marlene Tromp (born 1966) is an American academic administrator who has served as the president of Boise State University since July 1, 2019.

Early life and education 
Tromp was born and raised in Green River, Wyoming. A first-generation college student, Tromp initially aspired to become a medical doctor. Tromp received a scholarship and worked several part-time jobs to attend Creighton University. Discovering a passion for English and poetry, Tromp earned a Bachelor of Arts from Creighton and returned to Wyoming to attend the University of Wyoming, where she earned a Master of Arts in English. Tromp then earned a PhD in English from the University of Florida.

Career 
Prior to becoming president of Boise State University, Tromp served as provost and executive vice chancellor at University of California, Santa Cruz and dean the Arizona State University New College of Interdisciplinary Arts and Sciences. Succeeding Bob Kustra, Tromp became the first female president of Boise State in July 2019.

References 

Living people
Women heads of universities and colleges
Boise State University people
University of California, Santa Cruz staff
Arizona State University faculty
People from Green River, Wyoming
Creighton University alumni
University of Wyoming alumni
University of Florida alumni
1966 births